is a former Japanese football player and manager. who is the current head coach of Japan U23.

Playing career
Oiwa was born in Shizuoka on June 23, 1972. After graduating from University of Tsukuba, he joined Nagoya Grampus Eight in 1995. From first season, he played as center-back with Alexandre Torres for long years. The club won the champions 1995 and 1999 Emperor's Cup. In Asia, the club won the 2nd place 1996–97 Asian Cup Winners' Cup. He moved to Júbilo Iwata in September 2000. The club won the champions 2002 J1 League and the 2nd place 2000–01 Asian Club Championship. In 2003, he moved to rival club Kashima Antlers, biggest rival competed for the champions with Júbilo. He played as center-back with Yutaka Akita or Daiki Iwamasa. Although his opportunity to play decreased from 2007, the club won the champions for 3 years in a row (2007-2009). The club also won the champions 2007 and 2010 Emperor's Cup. He retired end of 2010 season.

On February 5, 2000, Oiwa debuted for Japan national team against Mexico. He played 3 games for Japan in 2000.

Club statistics

National team statistics

Coaching career

After retirement, Oiwa became a coach for Kashima Antlers in 2011. In May 2017, he became a manager as Masatada Ishii successor. In 2018 he led the team to the final to meet Persepolis in the 2018 AFC Champions League, Oiwa overcome the absence of 5 players injured, In addition to the fatigue at the end of the season after playing 52 match, Kashima Antlers beat Persepolis with two goal in the 1st leg. The team finally won the AFC Champions League.

Managerial statistics

Honours

Player
Nagoya Grampus Eight
 Emperor's Cup: 1995, 1999

Kashima Antlers
 J1 League: 2002, 2007, 2008, 2009
 Emperor's Cup: 2007, 2010
 A3 Champions Cup: 2003

Manager
Kashima Antlers
 Japanese Super Cup: 2017
 AFC Champions League: 2018

Individual
 J.League Best Eleven: 2001
 Asian Coach of the Year: 2018

References

External links
 
 Japan National Football Team Database
 
 

1972 births
Living people
University of Tsukuba alumni
Association football people from Shizuoka Prefecture
Japanese footballers
Japan international footballers
J1 League players
Nagoya Grampus players
Júbilo Iwata players
Kashima Antlers players
Japanese football managers
J1 League managers
Kashima Antlers managers
Association football defenders